Jo Mi-hye (born November 2, 1981), better known by her stage name Miryo, is a South Korean rapper, songwriter and record producer. She is currently the rapper of girl group Brown Eyed Girls, and is a former member of rap group Honey Family. Miryo debuted as a soloist in 2012, after appearing as a producer in the first season of Show Me the Money.

Early life 
In her interview with rapper/YouTuber Grace Kim, she revealed that she started off as a singer, where her mother is a music teacher, with a habit of playing classical music in the morning, which influenced her to sing since she was 5 all the way through junior high and high school, until she left home at 17 and went all the way to Daehangno, Seoul, and became a hip-hop dancer and rapper instead, before dropping out of high school, and joined a Canadian college in the hip hop club.

Career
Miryo began her music career in 2000, when she featured on a song by underground hip-hop group Honey Family. She joined the group as the main female rapper the following year and participated in their second album. After the team disbanded, she featured in other hip-hop artists' songs, such as former groupmate Gil Seong-joon from Leessang, and MC Mong. Soon after, Miryo received and accepted an offer from singer JeA to join Brown Eyed Girls. She became the rapper of the group, which debuted with an album entitled "Your Story" in March 2006. Brown Eyed Girls eventually achieved mainstream success in 2009 with their hit song Abracadabra, which was followed up by their equally acclaimed song "Sixth Sense" in 2011.

In 2012,  Miryo appeared as a producer on the rap competition TV show Show Me the Money, and was the only female judge. During the show she mentored Cheetah, who went on to win the first season of Unpretty Rapstar three years later. After her appearance on Show Me the Money, she made her solo debut with the self-produced album "MIRYO aka JOHONEY". The album featured a variety of artists who ranged from idols to hip hop heavyweights. Brown Eyed Girls returned with their fifth studio album Black Box in July 2013, and promoted the title song Kill Bill. In November of that year, Miryo and fellow Brown Eyed Girls member Narsha formed a subunit called M&N. The subunit released their first single, entitled "Tonight", on November 11.

Miryo released her single album "Queen" in July 2015, with the title song featuring her groupmate Ga-In. In September of that year, she and the other members of Brown Eyed Girls left their agency Nega Network. The group signed with Mystic Entertainment in October and released their album Basic the next month.

Songwriting
In addition to being a rapper, Miryo is also a songwriter. Among female idols, Miryo has copyright to the most songs, having a total of 56 songs by March 2013. She has been a composer and lyricist for Honey Family and also her current group Brown Eyed Girls.

Discography

Extended plays

Singles

Other charted songs

Filmography

Variety shows

References

External links 

 
 
 
 Official website of Nega Network 

1981 births
Living people
Mystic Entertainment artists
South Korean women pop singers
South Korean female idols
South Korean women rappers
Chung-Ang University alumni
People from Suncheon
Brown Eyed Girls members
21st-century South Korean women singers
21st-century South Korean singers